József Petheő (4 December 1731 – 3 July 1809) was a Hungarian prelate of the Roman Catholic Church. From 1797 until his death in 1809, he served as Auxiliary Bishop of Pécs.

Biography 
Petheő was born in Pécs, Austria-Hungary on 4 December 1731. He was ordained a deacon on 12 January 1755, and was ordained a priest on 31 March 1755.

On 24 July 1797, at the age of 65, he was appointed Auxiliary Bishop of the Diocese of Pécs by Pope Pius VI. On that same day, he was also appointed Titular Bishop of Methone, and was consecrated on 10 September 1797.

He died on 3 July 1809.

References 

1731 births
1809 deaths
18th-century Roman Catholic bishops in Hungary
19th-century Roman Catholic bishops in Hungary